Vallamai Tharayo is a 2016 Indian Tamil-language soap opera that aired Monday through Thursday on MediaCorp Vasantham from 4 April 2016 to 23 June 2016 on Monday through Thursday at 10:00PM SST for 45 episodes.

The show starred Narain Subramaniam, Gayathri Segharan, Nitya Rao, Indira Chandran, Suprina Panu and Kannan among others. It was produced by The show Frames Entertainment Pte Ltd and directed by R. Virenthira.

Plot
The story of Vallamai Tharayo follows the lives of Mahesh, an excellent doctor, as well as Sandhya, a chirpy art teacher and how their paths intertwine. Though Mahesh is backed by a good team of assistants he is haunted by the only failure in his career. With his competition waiting for him to fumble, his career becomes almost vulnerable. Will the team he has built save his name? Will Mahesh and Sandhya be able to find the strength to overcome these challenges together?

Cast

Main cast

 Narain as Dr. Mahesh
 Gayathiri Sekaran as Sandhya
 Shali Nivekas as Ramya
 Raren
 Indira Chanthiran as Indira
 Deepak Dinkar
 Shafinah Banu as Jaya
 Ebi Shankara as Muru
 Elias as Mani
 Kannan
 Jayaram
 Gunaseelan 
 Lingam
 Nishma
 Azhagu

Additional cast

 Sharon as Anjali, Sandhya's sister
 Harikrishnan as Arun, Anjali's boyfriend
 Jamuna Rani as Jamuna, Sandhya's mother
 Jagan
 Viki
 Sumithiran
 Nanthapalan
 Pathma
 Mahesh
 Surya
 Pathumala
 Thulasi
 Nilu
 Iswarya
 Hema
 Deepak
 Gopinanthan
 Maravathy

Special appearance

 Somasundram
 Alikhan
 Maniyan
 Pannirselvam
 Kumaran
 Jems Kumar
 Divya Ravid

Original soundtrack

Soundtrack

Broadcast
Series was released on April 4, 2016 on Mediacorp Vasantham. It airs in Malaysia on Mediacorp Vasantham, Its full length episodes and released its episodes on their app Toggle, a live TV feature was introduced on Toggle with English subtitles.

References

External links 
 Vasantham Official Website
 Vasantham Facebook
 Vallamai Tharayo Serial Episode

Vasantham TV original programming
Tamil-language television shows in Singapore
Tamil-language medical television series
Tamil-language romance television series
Singapore Tamil dramas
2016 Tamil-language television series debuts
2016 Tamil-language television series endings